Below is a list of bus companies operating in Israel.
Afikim
Dan Bus Company
Galim
Egged Bus Cooperative
Egged Ta'avura
Illit
Kavim
Metrodan
Metropoline
Nativ Express
Superbus
Tour Bus
United Tours

Foreign
Connex